Sailing at the 2005 Southeast Asian Games took place at the Subic Bay Yacht Club, Subic Bay Freeport Zone, Zambales, Philippines. Twelve gold medals were contested. The event was scheduled to be held from November 26 to December 4, but wind conditions led to the organisers bringing the races forward to conclude the events by December 2.

Medal table

Medalists

Men & boys

Women & girls

Open & mixed

Events

420 Men's Open

1) Disqualified.

420 Boy's

1) Disqualified.

470 Men's

1) Disqualified.

Laser Radial Women's

Hobie 16 Men's

External links
Southeast Asian Games Official Results

2005 Southeast Asian Games events
2005 in sailing
2005
Sailing competitions in the Philippines